One Night is an upcoming Australian television series made by Easy Tiger Productions and Motive Pictures for Paramount+. The series is written and created by Emily Ballou. The series will star Jodie Whittaker, Yael Stone and Nicole da Silva.

Synopsis
Three friends are forced to relive their traumatic memories from one night twenty years previously when one of them writes a book.

Cast
Jodie Whittaker as Tess
Yael Stone as Hat
Nicole da Silva as Simone
George Mason
Erroll Shand
Noni Hazlehurst
Tina Bursill
Damien Strouthos
Jillian Nguyen

Production
Emily Ballou is creator and writer of the project with episodes directed by Catherine Millar and Lisa Matthews. Ian Collie, Rob Gibson and Ally Henville are producers for Easy Tiger Productions on the project. Simon Maxwell is executive producer for Motive Pictures, with Harriet Creelman, co-executive producer and Emily Ballou also serving as executive producer.

Casting
Jodie Whittaker, Yael Stone, and Nicole da Silva were announced as leads on the series in February 2023. Also announced as among the cast were George Mason, Erroll Shand, Noni Hazlehurst, Tina Bursill, Damien Strouthos and Jillian Nguyen.

Filming
Filming started in early 2023 in Sydney, Australia and the Illawarra region of New South Wales.

References

External links

Upcoming television series
Television shows filmed in Australia